Rocketsports Racing was a motor racing team based in East Lansing, Michigan in the United States.

Team history

Rocketsports was founded in 1985 by racing driver Paul Gentilozzi to compete in the Trans-Am series. It competed in Trans-Am until 2004, when the championship was cancelled, and achieved 57 outright wins in 20 years. It has also raced in the IMSA sports car racing championship.

Rocketsports joined Champ Car in 2003 with driver Alex Tagliani, who scored the team's only victory at Road America in 2004.  In 2005 and 2006 the team fielded cars for pay drivers and frequently changed drivers. In 2007, Tagliani returned full-time and the team shared technical information with RuSPORT. This alliance was dubbed RSPORTS, and took a race win with RuSPORT's Justin Wilson. However, the alliance ended at the end of the season. In 2008, following the unification of Champ Car and the IRL, Rocketsports announced that it would not transition to the IndyCar Series. They did compete in the Champ Car finale at Long Beach Grand Prix, with drivers Antônio Pizzonia, who competed for Rocketsports at Long Beach in 2006, and Juho Annala.

Since the demise of Champ Car, Rocketsports has competed in the revived Trans-Am Series with driver Tomy Drissi, winning the 2009 championship.

Gentilozzi went on to form RSR Racing in 2009.

Drivers that have competed for Rocketsports in Champ Car
 Juho Annala (2008)
 Mario Dominguez (2006)
 Memo Gidley (2004)
 Timo Glock (2005)
 Ryan Hunter-Reay (2005)
 Tõnis Kasemets (2006)
 Michael McDowell (2005)
 Nicky Pastorelli (2006)
 Nelson Philippe (2004)
 Antônio Pizzonia (2006, 2008)
 Guy Smith (2004)
 Alex Tagliani (2003–2004, 2007)

Racing results

Complete CART / Champ Car World Series results
(key) (results in bold indicate pole position) (results in italics indicate fastest lap)

  Competed as RSPORTS at Rds. 1–10.

Complete IndyCar Series results
(key)

 Run to Champ Car specifications.
 Non-points-paying, exhibition race.

References

External links

Grand American Road Racing Association teams
Champ Car teams
24 Hours of Le Mans teams
American auto racing teams
Companies based in Ingham County, Michigan
Sports in Lansing, Michigan
American Le Mans Series teams
Auto racing teams established in 1985
1985 establishments in Michigan
IndyCar Series teams
Auto racing teams disestablished in 2009